Artioposthia is a genus of land planarians from the Australasian and Indo-Pacific countries. Several species have also been introduced in Europe.

Description
Species of Artioposthia are characterized by a cylindrical pharynx and ovaries placed anteriorly to the male copulatory apparatus, close to the brain or to the pharynx. The copulatory apparatus has a series of paired glandular organs called adenodactyls.

Artioposthia is very similar to the closely related genus Arthurdendyus, the main difference being the position of the ovaries and the shape of the pharynx.

Species
The genus Artioposthia includes the following species:

Artioposthia adelaidensis (Dendy, 1892)
Artioposthia civis Cardale, 1941
Artioposthia diemenensis (Dendy, 1894)
Artioposthia dovei (Steel, 1900)
Artioposthia exulans (Dendy, 1901)
Artioposthia fletcheri (Dendy, 1891)
Artioposthia garveyi (Dendy, 1901)
Artioposthia glandulosa Fyfe, 1956
Artioposthia harrisoni Wood, 1926
Artioposthia howesi (Dendy, 1901)
Artioposthia japonica Kaburakki, 1922
Artioposthia mariae (Dendy, 1895)
Artioposthia polyadoides Fyfe, 1956
Artioposthia subquadrangulata (Dendy, 1895)
Artioposthia suteri (Dendy, 1897)
Artioposthia warragulensis (Graff, 1899)

References 

Geoplanidae
Rhabditophora genera